Note: the southern headwater of the River Esk in Lothian is also known as the South Esk.

The South Esk is a river in Angus, Scotland. It rises in the Grampian Mountains at Loch Esk in Glen Doll and flows through Glen Clova to Strathmore at Cortachy, 5 km north of Kirriemuir. Its course takes it past Brechin and enters the North Sea at Montrose.

The river gives its name to the title of Earl of Southesk, held by the Carnegie family.

References

South Esk